Kookaburras are terrestrial tree kingfishers of the genus Dacelo native to Australia and New Guinea, which grow to between  in length and weigh around . The name is a loanword from Wiradjuri guuguubarra, onomatopoeic of its call. The loud, distinctive call of the laughing kookaburra is widely used as a stock sound effect in situations that involve an Australian bush setting or tropical jungle, especially in older movies. 

They are found in habitats ranging from humid forest to arid savannah, as well as in suburban areas with tall trees or near running water. Though they belong to the larger group known as "kingfishers", kookaburras are not closely associated with water.

Taxonomy
The genus Dacelo was introduced by English zoologist William Elford Leach in 1815. The type species is the laughing kookaburra. The name Dacelo is an anagram of alcedo, the Latin word for a kingfisher. A molecular study published in 2017 found that the genus Dacelo, as currently defined, is paraphyletic. The shovel-billed kookaburra was previously classified in the monotypic genus Clytoceyx, but was reclassified into Dacelo based on phylogenetic evidence.

Classification and species
Five species of kookaburra can be found in Australia, New Guinea, and the Aru Islands:
 Shovel-billed kookaburra (Dacelo rex) – upland New Guinea
 Spangled kookaburra (Dacelo tyro) – Aru Islands, southern New Guinea
 Rufous-bellied kookaburra (Dacelo gaudichaud) – lowland New Guinea
 Laughing kookaburra (Dacelo novaeguineae) – native to eastern Australia, introduced to southwest
 Blue-winged kookaburra (Dacelo leachii) – northern Australia, southern New Guinea
Unusually for close relatives, the laughing and blue-winged species are direct competitors in the area where their ranges now overlap. This suggests that these two species evolved in isolation, possibly during a period when Australia and New Guinea were more distant.

Kookaburras are sexually dimorphic. This is noticeable in the blue-winged and the rufous-bellied, where males have blue tails and females have reddish-brown tails.

Behaviour 

Kookaburras are almost exclusively carnivorous, eating mice, snakes, insects, small reptiles, and the young of other birds; unlike many other kingfishers, they rarely eat fish, although they have been known to take goldfish from garden ponds. In zoos, they are usually fed food for birds of prey.

The most social birds accept handouts and take meat from barbecues. Feeding kookaburras ground beef or pet food is not advised, as these do not include enough calcium and roughage.

They are territorial, except for the rufous-bellied, which often live with their young from the previous season. They often sing as a chorus to mark their territory.

Conservation
All kookaburra species are listed as least concern. Australian law protects native birds, including kookaburras.

In popular culture 

The distinctive sound of the laughing kookaburra's call resembles human laughter, is widely used in filmmaking and television productions, as well as certain Disney theme-park attractions, regardless of African, Asian, or South American jungle settings. Kookaburras have also appeared in several video games, including (Lineage II, Battletoads, and World of Warcraft). The children's television series Splatalot! includes an Australian character called "Kookaburra" (or "Kook"), whose costume includes decorative wings that recall the bird's plumage, and who is noted for his distinctive, high-pitched laugh. Olly the Kookaburra was one of the three mascots chosen for the 2000 Summer Olympics in Sydney. The other mascots were Millie the Echidna and Syd the Platypus. The call of a kookaburra nicknamed "Jacko" was for many years used as the morning opening theme by ABC radio stations, and for Radio Australia's overseas broadcasts.

Book 

 The opening theme from ABC was the basis for a children's book by Brooke Nicholls titled Jacko, the Broadcasting Kookaburra — His Life and Adventures.
 In William Arden's 1969 book, The Mystery of the Laughing Shadow (one of the Three Investigators series for young readers), the laughing kookaburra is integral to the plot.
 In the short story (Barry Wood's "Nowhere to Go").

Film 

 The overarching antagonist of Koala Man (2023) is a character named Christopher, who later takes on the identity of "The Kookaburra". Voiced by Jemaine Clement, he is the titular character's former friend turned archnemesis and often makes calls similar to the bird.
 Heard in some of the early Johnny Weissmuller films, the first occurrence was in Tarzan and the Green Goddess (1938).
 The call is heard in The Wizard of Oz (1939), The Treasure of the Sierra Madre (1948), Swiss Family Robinson (1960), Cape Fear (1962), The Lost World: Jurassic Park, and other films.
 The dolphin call in the television series Flipper (1964-7) is a modified kookaburra call.
 The call is imitated perfectly by the character Billy (David Gulpilil) in the Australian film Mad Dog Morgan (1976).
 The call can be heard at the beginning of Raiders of the Lost Ark (1981) in the jungle scene.
 The call can be heard in the Australian film True History of the Kelly Gang (2019) when Constable Fitzpatrick is investigating the first killings by the newly formed Kelly Gang.

Music 

 "Kookaburra [sits in the old gum tree]", a well-known children's song, was written in 1932 by Marion Sinclair.
 "Kookaburra" by Cocteau Twins was released on their 1985 EP Aikea-Guinea.
 "Kookaburra" by John Vanderslice is on his 2007 album Emerald City.
 The Kookaburras are an English band from County Durham.
 The lyric "... the Laughing Kookaburras call ..." appears in the song "Across the Hills of Home" on the album Something of Value by Eric Bogle.
 BFD Records and BFD Productions, which are the distributors and/or copyright holders of most of the garage rock and psychedelic rock compilation albums in the Pebbles series, have the address Kookaburra, Australia.
 "Well the kookaburra laughed ..." appeared in the song "Old Man Emu" by John Williamson.
 Australian band King Gizzard and the Lizard Wizard features the kookaburra's call in their songs "Doom City" from the album Flying Microtonal Banana and "All Is Known" from the album Gumboot Soup, both released in 2017.

Postage stamps 

 A six-pence stamp was issued in 1914.
 A three-pence commemorative Australian stamp was issued for the 1928 Melbourne International Philatelic Exhibition. 
 A six-pence stamp was issued in 1932.
 A 38¢ Australian stamp issued in 1990 features a pair of kookaburras.
 An international $1.70 Australian stamp featuring an illustrated kookaburra was released in 2013.
A $1.10 laughing kookaburra stamp issued in 2020

Money

 An Australian coin known as the Silver Kookaburra has been minted annually since 1990.
 The kookaburra is featured multiple times on the Australian twenty-dollar note.

Usage across sport

 The Australian 12-m yacht Kookaburra III lost the America's Cup in 1987.
 The Australia men's national field hockey team is named after the kookaburra. They were world champions in field hockey in 1986, 2010 and 2014.
 Australian sports equipment company Kookaburra Sport is named after the bird.

References

Bibliography

Further reading 
 Kookaburra sketches and calls at the Australian National Botanic Gardens site. Archived from the original on 2008-07-20. Retrieved 2010-09-03.

External links 

 Close up video recording of kookaburra song

 
^
Taxa named by William Elford Leach
Australian Aboriginal words and phrases
Kingfishers
 Sound effects